The 2008 Senior League World Series took place from August 10–16 in Bangor, Maine, United States. Upper Deerfield, New Jersey defeated Willemstad, Curaçao in the championship game.

The best pitcher was Justin Rentsch from New Philadelphia

Teams

Results

Group A

Group B

Elimination round

References

Senior League World Series
Senior League World Series
2008 in sports in Maine